Carkin is a civil parish in North Yorkshire, England. It was created from the separation of the parish of Forcett and Carkin into "Carkin" and "Forcett" in 2015.

References 

Civil parishes in North Yorkshire
Richmondshire